The 1899–1900 Harvard Crimson men's ice hockey season was the third season of play for the program.

Season
For the first time Harvard was able to play a more rounded schedule. The Crimson won most of their games and were in contention for the Intercollegiate championship until losing their final game of the season to Yale. The contest against the Bulldogs was the first in what would become college ice hockey's oldest rivalry.

Roster

Standings

Schedule and Results

|-
!colspan=12 style=";" | Regular Season

References

Harvard Crimson men's ice hockey seasons
Harvard
Harvard
Harvard
Harvard
Harvard
Harvard